1975 World Cup can refer to:
 1975 Alpine Skiing World Cup
 1975 Cricket World Cup
 1975 Rugby League World Cup
 1975 World Cup (men's golf)